The Project of Engineer Prite is a 1918 short film directed by Lev Kuleshov.

Plot 
Two power plants compete for the extraction of peat.

Starring 
 N. Gardy	
 Yelena Komarova
 Boris Kuleshov	
 Eduard Kulganek	
 L. Polevoy

References

External links 
 

1918 films
1910s Russian-language films
Russian silent films
Russian black-and-white films